The 1989 Colorado Buffaloes football team represented the University of Colorado at Boulder in the Big Eight Conference during the 1989 NCAA Division I-A football season. Colorado finished with the most wins in school history, surpassing the 1971 team, and their first conference championship in thirteen years. The Buffaloes went undefeated in the regular season at 11–0 (7–0 in Big 8) and played for the national title, but lost to fourth-ranked Notre Dame in the Orange Bowl.

The team dedicated the season to senior and former starting quarterback Sal Aunese, who was diagnosed with stomach cancer in late March, and died at age 21 on September 23 due to complications from the disease.

For the first time in 28 years, Colorado defeated Oklahoma and Nebraska in the same season. In the 27 seasons in between, they had five wins over Oklahoma (1965, 1966, 1968, 1972, 1976) and two over Nebraska (1967, 1986).

In another feel-good story, the team was host to a Make A Wish recipient Chad Henry for the big game against Nebraska in Boulder. Henry was an up-and-coming high school football player from Indiana, Pennsylvania, and the son of college/NFL coach Jack Henry, who began following the Buffaloes after reading about Sal Aunese's battle with cancer while himself battling a very rare and dangerous form of abdominal cancer. After cheering on the Buffs to the biggest win in school history in early November, Henry and his family were also invited to attend the national championship game in Miami as guests of the university. He went on to defeat the disease and did play football for his high school again in 1990. Although his once promising football career was ended following that season due to complications with side effects from the intense chemotherapy he endured, Henry went on to coach football at his high school and became a scout for the NFL's Detroit Lions and is currently with the Indianapolis Colts.

Schedule

Personnel

Rankings

Season summary

Texas

Colorado State

Illinois

at Washington

Missouri

at Iowa State

Kansas

at Oklahoma

Colorado 8-0 for first time since 1927
Culbertson's field goal in second quarter gave Colorado its first lead over Oklahoma in a game since 1976
Colorado's first win in Norman since 1965
J.J. Flannigan 25 rushes, 103 yards
Arthur Walker 8 tackles, sack (Big 8 Defensive Player of Week)

Nebraska

Colorado honored their All-Century team at halftime

at Oklahoma State

at Kansas State

Orange Bowl (vs. Notre Dame)

References

External links
Sports-Reference – 1989 Colorado Buffaloes

Colorado
Colorado Buffaloes football seasons
Big Eight Conference football champion seasons
Colorado Buffaloes football